The Scientific Activist was a blog that covers science, politics, and science policy, run by Nick Anthis, a graduate student in biochemistry and Rhodes Scholar at the University of Oxford. The Scientific Activist gained international recognition in February 2006 when it published information that led to the immediate resignation of Bush Administration NASA appointee George Deutsch. Deutsch—who had been accused of censoring scientific information at NASA—claimed to have graduated from Texas A&M University on his résumé, but Anthis discovered that Deutsch had not, in fact, completed his degree there.

The Scientific Activist was founded on January 11, 2006, and was originally hosted by Blogger. It gained early attention for its coverage of Oxford's vocal animal rights movement, and it continued its coverage as the pro-research Pro-Test movement was formed. On June 9, 2006, The Scientific Activist moved to ScienceBlogs.

In July 2006, The Scientific Activist was named one of Nature's "Top five science blogs."

Notes and sources

External links
The Scientific Activist, current site
The Scientific Activist, original site (archives January 11—June 21, 2006)

Science blogs
British science websites
Science activism